Horace is a 1972 television play written by Roy Minton and directed by Alan Clarke, first broadcast as part of a BBC1 new play series on 21 March 1972.

Plot
Diabetic Horace (Barry Jackson) is mentally impaired and works in a joke shop. He befriends loner schoolboy Gordon Blackett (Stephen Tantum), who retreats from his loveless home into an imaginary world.

Cast
Horace - Barry Jackson
Gordon - Stephen Tantum
Ivy - Christine Hargreaves
Dick - Talfryn Thomas
Mrs Radford - Hazel Coppen
Sidney - James Mellor
Miss Bowler - Patricia Lawrence
Mr Scrimshaw - Robert Hartley
Mr Frankel - Howard Goorney
Whitsun - Ken Parry
Brenda - Caleigh Simmons
Mrs Beal - Daphne Heard
Customer - Eric Francis
Waitress - Pamela Miles
Jeffries - Jeffrey Gardiner

Critical reception
The Daily Telegraph wrote "Never sentimentalised... sympathetic, touching The piece worked marvellously well."

Television series
The play was later developed as a six-part half-hour series for Yorkshire Television.

References

External links
 

1972 television plays
BBC television dramas
1972 in British television